Pieter Steinz (6 October 1963 in Rotterdam – 29 August 2016 in Haarlem) was a Dutch journalist, literary critic and non-fiction author. From 2012 to 2015 he was director of the Nederlands Letterenfonds.

Bibliography
 1991 Meneer Van Dale Wacht Op Antwoord en andere schoolse rijtjes en ezelsbruggetjes
 2002 Reis om de wereld in 80 hits (with Bernard Hulsman)
 2002 Drumeiland. Een bedevaart naar Bob Marley's geboorte-eiland Jamaica
 2003 Lezen &cetera. Gids voor de wereldliteratuur (reviseer edition: 2006)
 2004 Lezen op locatie. Atlas van de wereldliteratuur
 2006 Klein cultureel woordenboek van de wereldliteratuur (in 2008 reprinted as Het ABC van de wereldliteratuur)
 2006 Elk boek wil muziek zijn. Lezen & luisteren in schema’s, thema’s en citaten (with Peter de Bruijn)
 2007 Het web van de wereldliteratuur. Welke 100 boeken hebben de literaire X-factor?
 2010 De duivelskunstenaar. De reis van doctor Faust door 500 jaar cultuurgeschiedenis
 2010 Grote verwachtingen. Opgroeien in de letteren in 25 schema's
 2011 Luisteren &cetera. Het web van de popmuziek in de jaren zeventig (with Bertram Mourits)
 2011 Macbeth heeft echt geleefd. Een reis door Europa in de voetsporen van 16 literaire helden (in 2014 reprinted as Dracula heeft echt geleefd)
 2011 Verleden in verf. De Nederlandse geschiedenis in veertig schilderijen (with Hans den Hartog Jager)
 2014 Made in Europe. De kunst die ons continent bindt
 2014 Luisteren &cetera. Het web van de popmuziek in de jaren tachtig (with Bertram Mourits)
 2015 Steinz. Gids voor de wereldliteratuur in 416 schrijvers, 104 meesterwerken, 26 one-book wonders, 52 boekwebben, 26 thema's, 26 quizzen en 52 landkaarten (with Jet Steinz)
 2015 Waanzin in de wereldliteratuur (Boekenweekessay)
 2015 Lezen met ALS: Literatuur als levensbehoefte

External links
 Pieter Steinz, Directeur Nederlands Letterenfonds
 'Ik heb het geluk dat mijn leven in veel opzichten vervuld is' NRC Handelsblad, 1 March 2014
 Officiële blog: Read Around the Globe
 Uitgeverij Nieuw Amsterdam, Auteurspagina
 Nederlands letterenfonds: dankwoord Helena Vaz da Silva Award
 Uitzending 'De Wereld Draait Door', 17 February 2015

1963 births
2016 deaths
20th-century Dutch male writers